A list of films produced in South Korea in 2001:

External links
 2001 in South Korea
 2001 in South Korean music

 2001 at www.koreanfilm.org

2001
South Korean
Box